Rodolfo Clavería (20 October 1922 – 24 March 1999) was a Chilean footballer. He played in two matches for the Chile national football team in 1946. He was also part of Chile's squad for the 1946 South American Championship.

References

External links
 

1922 births
1999 deaths
Chilean footballers
Chile international footballers
Place of birth missing
Association football defenders
Club Deportivo Universidad Católica footballers